Snow Hill is an unincorporated community in Washington Township, Randolph County, in the U.S. state of Indiana.

History
Snow Hill was first settled about 1838. An old variant name of the community was called Mount Pleasant.

A post office was established at Snow Hill in 1856, and remained in operation until it was discontinued in 1907.

Geography

References

Unincorporated communities in Randolph County, Indiana
Unincorporated communities in Indiana